Stuie is a community in the Bella Coola Valley of the Central Coast region of British Columbia, Canada, located at the confluence of the Atnarko and Talchako Rivers, which is the "start" of the Bella Coola River.

References

Unincorporated settlements in British Columbia
Pacific Ranges
Bella Coola Valley